Fujie (written: 藤江) is a Japanese surname. Notable people with the surname include:

, Japanese baseball player
, Japanese general
, Japanese scientist
, Japanese idol
, Japanese basketball player
, Japanese basketball player

Fujie (written: 冨士枝) is also a feminine Japanese given name. Notable people with the name include:

, Japanese table tennis player
, Japanese nurse and midwife

Japanese feminine given names
Japanese-language surnames